The 1971 Tanglewood International Tennis Classic was a men's tennis tournament held at Tanglewood Park in Clemmons, North Carolina in the United States that was part of the Grand Prix circuit and categorized as a Group C event. The tournament was played on outdoor clay courts and was held from July 19 through July 25, 1971. It was the inaugural edition of the tournament and unseeded Jaime Fillol won the singles title and earned $5,000 first-prize money.

Finals

Singles
 Jaime Fillol defeated  Željko Franulović 4–6, 6–4, 7–6
 It was Fillol's 1st singles title of the year and the 2nd of his career in the Open Era.

Doubles
 Jim McManus /  Jim Osborne defeated  Jimmy Connors /  Jeff Austin 6–2, 6–4

References

Tanglewood International Tennis Classic
Tanglewood International Tennis Classic
Tanglewood International Tennis Classic
Tanglewood International Tennis Classic
Rainier International Tennis Classic, 1971